Khurai is a town in Sagar District and a municipality in the Indian state of Madhya Pradesh. It is located in the northeastern region of Madhya Pradesh.

Climate
Khurai has a mainly moderate climate. Winters are moderately cool and summers are hot. Monsoon season lasts from June through August.

Demographics
As of the 2011 census of India, Khurai has a population of 51,108. Males constitute 53% of the population and females 47%. Khurai has an average literacy rate of 80.8%, higher than the national average of 59.5%.

Economy
The main business in the Khurai region is agriculture. The main crops grown there are wheat (sharbati), soybean and gram. The city is a hub for the manufacturing of agricultural equipment such as threshers, cultivators, ploughs, seed drills and trollies.

A hospital, round-the-clock mobile medical vehicle, a national level auditorium, badminton court and gym have been set up in the area by the state government.

Localities and suburbs
Ghourat
Jagdishpura
Jarwaans Shareef

References

External links
Khurai
Khurai Town

 
Cities and towns in Sagar district